NSL may refer to:
National Soccer League (US)

Government and politics
 National Security League, an American preparedness organization
 National Socialist League, a British pre–World War II Nazi group
 National Socialist League (United States), a gay neo-Nazi party in the U.S., 1974–1980s
 National Socialist Legion, an American neo-nazi group
 National security letter, an administrative subpoena issued by the U.S. government 
 National Security Act (South Korea)
 Hong Kong national security law

Sports
 Naša Sinalko Liga, a Serbian basketball league known as the Sinalco League
 National Softball League, a British amateur co-ed slow pitch softball league
 National Soccer League, a defunct Australian professional soccer league
 Netball Superleague, a British netball league
 Nottinghamshire Senior League, an English association football league

Transportation
 NSL Buses, London, England
 North South MRT line of the Singapore Mass Rapid Transit system

Other
 NSL Services Group, a business group in London, England
 Nanosphere lithography, a method to produce nanoscopic structures
 Nicaraguan Sign Language
 Norwegian Sign Language
 Nintendo Switch Lite
 Nuziveedu Seeds Limited

See also

 National Soccer League (disambiguation)
 National Security Law (disambiguation)
 Negro Southern League (disambiguation)
 NSEL (disambiguation)
 NSI (disambiguation)
 NS1 (disambiguation)